The Berenstain Bears is an animated comedy television series based on  the children's book series of the same name by Stan and Jan Berenstain, produced by Southern Star Productions/Hanna Barbera Australia. It aired in the United States from September 14, 1985, to September 5, 1987, on CBS with 52 11-minute episodes in 26 half-hour shows produced. Each show consisted of two episodes, the first being an adaptation of one of the books, the second being an original story. The series was nominated in 1987 for a Daytime Emmy award for Outstanding Performer in Children's Programming; it was also nominated that year for a Humanitas Prize in the category of Non-Prime Time Children's Animated Show.

In addition to creating the original books, Stan and Jan Berenstain were producers on the show, and wrote some of the scripts.

A second cartoon series aired on PBS Kids in 2003–2004.

Plot

The series is set in a world populated only by anthropomorphic bears and primarily centers around the Berenstain Bears. The Berenstain Bears are a family residing in the rural community of Bear Country consisting of Mama Bear, Papa Q. Bear, Brother Bear, and Sister Bear. The series teaches lessons, continues from the TV specials, and expands Bear Country as well as character development. Each episode follows the struggles of the family, mainly the cubs. Other episodes involve "The Bear Detectives and their sniffer hound Snuff", Papa Q. Bear's attempts of honey gathering, interaction with forest creatures, and attempts by villains to take over Bear Country. It states that Brother Bear is in 2nd Grade then in 3rd Grade while Sister Bear is in kindergarten then in 1st Grade. The characters and setting are from various books written by Stan & Jan Berenstain as well as from several television specials by Joe Cates. Other characters are Actual Factual, Big Paw, Mayor Horace J. Honeypot, Farmer Ben, and Grizzly Gramps & Gran. Characters also introduced are Officer Marguerete, Queen Nectar, and Jake. Queen Nectar and Jake are not bears but they do talk and interact with the humanoid bears. Sister Bear plays with many of the forest animals such as Frog & Butterfly. There are many other background characters that live in the nearby forest land; the bears live among the forest and nature just as they did in the television specials. The main antagonists of the series are the swindler Raffish Ralph and occasionally Weasel McGreed, seen in six episodes. To a lesser extent, Too Tall Grizzly is another antagonist, again serving as the school bully.

Episodes

Voice cast
 Ruth Buzzi as Mama, Grizzly Gran, Scout Leader Jane, Queen Nectar, and others
 Brian Cummings as Papa, Actual Factual, Bigpaw, Too Tall, Horace J. Honeypot, and others
 David Mendenhall as Brother
 Christina Lange as Sister
 Frank Welker as Raffish Ralph, Weasel McGreed, Grizzly Gramps, Farmer Ben, and others
 Josh Rodine as Cousin Fred

Production
Stan & Jan Berenstain contracted with independent producer Joe Cates in 1979 to make a Christmas Special. They continued to make one holiday special each year for five years. They stopped making holiday specials after "The Berenstain Bears Play Ball" and began making a TV series based on the books and to a lesser extent, the same TV specials produced. Joe Cates and Buzz Potamkin produced this TV series as well. Elliott Lawrence continued to score music for the episodes which were based on his compositions from the five specials, but in a faster pace. While they no longer break out in song, the theme music (matching part of Stars and Stripes Forever) resembles the song lyrics from the specials. The program was produced by Southern Star Productions/Hanna Barbera Australia with new voice actors. The characters no longer talk in rhyme, and the TV series has the updated appearance and no longer has the rustic design of the earliest books. This TV series expanded tremendously of Bear Country which includes many characters, economy, and government. As a result, the episodes have a faster timing, and the characters seem much busier compared with the TV specials. The stories are now told without the narrator and are 11 minutes in length. The bear family had complex patterns on their clothes which were changed to solid colours for the animated specials, with the exception of Mama Bear's inside hat. The TV series omitted the spots entirely, but Mama's yellow "Go and Meet" hat was featured in a "Ghost of the Forest" adaptation. The episode "Ghost of the Forest" resembles a Halloween special, but it is a regular episode.

Broadcast and home media
Reruns aired briefly on TLC's Ready Set Learn block from September 28, 1998, to January 8, 1999, when a contract dispute forced TLC to pull the show off the schedule. During the early 2000s, reruns were later seen on DIC Kids Network syndicated programming block which primarily aired on some stations of FOX, the also now-defunct UPN, and The WB, but the episodes were edited and time-compressed by DIC. In Australia, where Southern Star is based in, the series was aired on Network Ten. A few episodes are available on VHS and DVD from various home entertainment companies like Random House Home Video, Avon, Feature Films for Families and Sony Pictures Home Entertainment, albeit with slight alterations (such as a different design for the episode title cards).

References

External links

Berenstain Bears website

1980s American children's television series
1980s American animated television series
1985 American television series debuts
1987 American television series endings
1985 Australian television series debuts
1987 Australian television series endings
American children's animated comedy television series
American television shows based on children's books
Australian children's animated comedy television series
Australian television shows based on children's books
English-language television shows
1985 TV
CBS original programming
UPN original programming
Fox Kids
Animated television series about bears
Animated television series about children
Animated television series about families
Animated television series about siblings
Television series by Endemol Australia
Television series by Hanna-Barbera